The Marin Theatre Company (MTC) is a 501(c)3 nonprofit organization and professional LORT D regional theater located in Mill Valley, California. Jasson Minadakis is the company's Artistic Director  and Meredith Suttles its Managing Director / CEO.

Reaching an annual audience of approximately 35,000 people, MTC offers a season of six mainstage productions that runs annually from August to June in its 231-seat Boyer Theatre. Recent notable productions since 2010 include the Bay Area premiere of Matthew Lopez's The Whipping Man, the 10th Anniversary revival of Suzan-Lori Parks's Pulitzer Prize for Drama-winning Topdog/Underdog, the Bay Area premiere of Annie Baker's Circle Mirror Transformation, the West Coast premiere of Keith Huff's A Steady Rain, the world premiere of Steve Yockey's Bellwether, the world premiere of Libby Appel's adaptation of Anton Chekhov's The Seagull, the world premiere of Bill Cain's 2011 Harold and Mimi Steinberg/American Theatre Critics Association New Play Award -winning 9 Circles, the West Coast premiere of Tarell Alvin McCraney's In the Red & Brown Water, and the Bay Area premiere of Bill Cain's 2010 Steinberg/ATCA New Play Award -winning Equivocation.

MTC is committed to the development and production of new plays by American playwrights, with a comprehensive New Play Program that includes world and regional premieres each season, two nationally recognized annual playwriting awards, new play readings and workshops by the nation’s best emerging playwrights and a National New Play Network Playwright in Residence.

MTC offers theater experiences and education programs for youth and teens, student matinees performances of mainstage shows, the Marin Young Playwrights Festival, the 24/7 twenty-four hour play festival, after-school classes, classroom workshops, summer camps and more. Approximately 12,000 students from over 40 Bay Area schools participate in our education programs each year.

History
Marin Theatre Company (MTC) was founded in 1966 when 35 Mill Valley residents came together under the leadership of Sali Lieberman  to create the Mill Valley Center for the Performing Arts (MVCPA). The nonprofit organization brought arts as diverse as film, theater, poetry, dance and concerts of classical, jazz and folk music to Marin County for a decade. After a number of successful community theater productions, MVCPA began to exclusively produce and present theater performances in 1977.

The small group overcame many challenges to put on critically acclaimed, award-winning plays in a golf clubhouse, a veterans’ auditorium and several schools and parks. To acknowledge the organization’s specialization in theater arts and expanded regional focus, MVCPA changed its name to Marin Theatre Company in 1984. This marked the beginning of a period of extraordinary growth. By 1987, MTC had become a professional theater company, opening its own theater complex with onsite administrative offices and joining with other local theaters to negotiate the first regional equity contract in the Bay Area. Since then, MTC began a new play program to support emerging American playwrights, launching a New Works developmental workshop and public reading series in 2004 and establishing two new play prizes in 2007. MTC joined the League of Resident Theatres and National New Play Network. in 2008. Most recently, MTC has invested in its production staff and assets, including the 2011 opening of a new 5,500 sq. ft scene shop facility on the Oakland/Emeryville, California border.

See also
American Conservatory Theater, San Francisco
Berkeley Repertory Theatre
TheatreWorks (Silicon Valley), Palo Alto, California
San Jose Repertory Theatre
Marin Shakespeare Company

References

External links
 
 Production history

Theatre companies in California
Tourist attractions in Marin County, California
Culture in the San Francisco Bay Area
Mill Valley, California